The Eternal Springtime is a 2021 Vietnamese documentary short film directed by Việt Vũ, which distributed by Mailuki Films. The film was selected to compete in the Ammodo Tiger Short section at the 50th International Film Festival Rotterdam.

Cast 
 Nguyễn Thị Tơ
 Việt Vũ
 Phạm Quang Trung
 Giàng A Pào
 Giàng A Sưa
 Hoang Thi Tu

Awards 

 Won  66th Cork International Film Festival: Grand Prix Documentary Short
 Won  12th Baku International Short Film Festival: Best Director Award (Việt Vũ)

References

External links 
 The Eternal Springtime at Mailuki Films
 The Eternal Springtime. The Trailer on the MAILUKI FILMS, S.L. official Vimeo channel
 
 

2021 short documentary films
2021 films
Films set in Vietnam
Vietnamese short documentary films
Documentary films about nature
Vietnamese-language films